The Indian independence movement consisted of efforts by individuals and organizations from a wide spectrum of society to obtain political independence from the British, French and Portuguese rule through the use of a many methods. This is a list of individuals who notably campaigned against or are considered to have campaigned against colonial rule on the Indian sub-continent.

Post-independence, the term "freedom fighter" was officially recognized by the Indian government for those who took part in the movement; people in this category (which can also include dependent family members) receive pensions and other benefits such as Special Railway Counters.

List of Indian freedom fighters

See also

:Category:Indian revolutionaries

Notes

References

Lists of Indian people
India history-related lists

Lists of activists
British India-related lists